Massachusetts House of Representatives' 20th Middlesex district in the United States is one of 160 legislative districts included in the lower house of the Massachusetts General Court. It covers parts of Essex County and Middlesex County. Republican Brad Jones of North Reading has represented the district since 2003.

Towns represented
The district includes the following localities:
 Lynnfield
 part of Middleton
 North Reading
 part of Reading

The current district geographic boundary overlaps with those of the Massachusetts Senate's 1st Essex and Middlesex district, 3rd Essex district, and 5th Middlesex district.

Former locales
The district previously covered:
 Concord, circa 1872 
 Lincoln, circa 1872 
 Weston, circa 1872

Representatives
 John Sullivan Eaton, circa 1858 
 Walter Littlefield, Jr., circa 1858 
 Loren L. Fuller, circa 1859 
 J. Parker Gould, circa 1859 
 George W. Trull, circa 1888 
 Joseph L. Larson, circa 1920 
 Willard P. Lombard, circa 1920 
 Francis Thomas Gallagher, circa 1951 
 Fred C. Harrington, circa 1951 
 George Keverian, circa 1967
 Frederick N. Dello Russo, circa 1975 
 Bradley H. Jones, Jr., 2003-current

See also
 List of Massachusetts House of Representatives elections
 List of Massachusetts General Courts
 List of former districts of the Massachusetts House of Representatives
 Other Middlesex County districts of the Massachusetts House of Representatives: 1st, 2nd, 3rd, 4th, 5th, 6th, 7th, 8th, 9th, 10th, 11th, 12th, 13th, 14th, 15th, 16th, 17th, 18th, 19th, 21st, 22nd, 23rd, 24th, 25th, 26th, 27th, 28th, 29th, 30th, 31st, 32nd, 33rd, 34th, 35th, 36th, 37th

Images
Portraits of legislators

References

External links
 Ballotpedia
  (State House district information based on U.S. Census Bureau's American Community Survey).
 League of Women Voters of Topsfield-Boxford-Middleton

House
Government of Middlesex County, Massachusetts
Government of Essex County, Massachusetts